See You in the Next War (transliterated: Doviđenja u sledećem ratu) is a 1980 Yugoslav war film directed by Živojin Pavlović. It competed in the Un Certain Regard section at the 1982 Cannes Film Festival.

The film's screenplay is based on the Vitomil Zupan's novel Menuet za kitaro (A Menuet for Guitar), published in 1975. Like the novel, the film takes place partially in Nazi-occupied Slovenia during World War II, and partially in Spain, where the main character, a former partisan, meets his former German adversary in a summer resort.

Cast
 Jozica Avbelj
 Ivo Ban - Tujcko
 Hans Christian Blech
 Joze Horvat
 Zvone Hribar
 Boris Juh
 Barbara Levstik
 Metod Pevec
 Tanja Poberznik
 Milan Puzic
 Janez Starina
 Ruth Gassmann

References

External links

1980 films
Serbo-Croatian-language films
Slovene-language films
Yugoslav World War II films
Films directed by Živojin Pavlović
Films based on Slovenian novels
War films set in Partisan Yugoslavia